The 2016 Shanghai Challenger was a professional tennis tournament played on hard courts. It was the sixth edition of the tournament which was part of the 2016 ATP Challenger Tour. It took place in Shanghai, China between 5 and 12 September 2016.

Singles main-draw entrants

Seeds

 1 Rankings are as of August 29, 2016.

Other entrants
The following players received wildcards into the singles main draw:
  Zhang Zhizhen
  Qiu Zhuoyang
  Gao Xin
  Sun Fajing

The following player received entry into the singles main draw with a protected ranking:
  Blaž Kavčič

The following player entered the singles main draw as an alternate"
  Norbert Gombos

The following players received entry from the qualifying draw:
  Yasutaka Uchiyama
  Matija Pecotić
  Xia Zihao
  Shuichi Sekiguchi

Champions

Singles

 Henri Laaksonen def.  Jason Jung 6–3, 6–3.

Doubles

 Hsieh Cheng-peng /  Yi Chu-huan def.  Gao Xin /  Li Zhe 7–6(8–6), 5–7, [10–0]

References

Shanghai Challenger
Shanghai Challenger
Shanghai Challenger